MMTS may refer to:
 Moscow Monorail
 Hyderabad Multi-Modal Transport System, a suburban railway in Hyderabad, Telangana, India
 MMTS (meteorology), the Maximum Minimum Temperature System used to track temperature over a period of time
 MMTS Kwidzyń, a team handball and a member of the European Handball Federation